Adnan Buyung Nasution, also known as Adnan Bahrum Nasution (20 July 1934 – 23 September 2015) was an Indonesian lawyer, advocate, and activist.

Career 
Nasution founded the Legal Aid Institute in Indonesia.  He was well known as a human rights and pro-democracy activist during the reign of Indonesia's late President Suharto. One of the partners at his law firm was former Chief Justice of the Supreme Court of Indonesia Suryadi. 

From the years 2007 to 2009, Nasution was a member of the Presidential Advisory Council's Legal Department.

Notable cases 

 In 1973, Vivian Rubiyanti Iskandar retained Nasution as counsel before the West Jakarta District Court. Nasution helped produce a ruling in favour of changing Vivian's legal gender to female, making her the first legally recognised transgender person in Indonesia.

Death 
Nasution died in Jakarta on 23 September 2015 from kidney failure and heart failure.

References

1934 births
2015 deaths
Indonesian Muslims
Indonesian anti-communists
People from Jakarta
People of Batak descent
Indonesian human rights activists
Melbourne Law School alumni
Deaths from kidney failure
20th-century Indonesian lawyers
21st-century Indonesian lawyers
Asian democracy activists
20th-century Dutch East Indies people